Kaniama Airport  is an airstrip serving the town of Kaniama in Haut-Lomami Province, Democratic Republic of the Congo.

See also

 Transport in the Democratic Republic of the Congo
 List of airports in the Democratic Republic of the Congo

References

External links
 OurAirports - Kaniama Airport
 FallingRain - Kaniama Airport
OpenStreetMap - Kaniama Airport
HERE Maps - Kaniama

Airports in Haut-Lomami